Bura Jungle is located three miles east of Dina City in district Jhelum and six miles from the famous Rohtas Fort. The population is around 1500 people, the majority of whom belong to the Gujjar tribe. The Grand Trunk Road passes through the village connecting Lahore and Rawalpindi. Bura Jungle Mosque is a famous landmark in the area of Jhelum and is situated in the village.
Famous Personality:

CH Muhammad Khan Pehlwan (Late):

One of the most Famous Pehlwan(wrestler) of his time.

References

Populated places in Jhelum District